Walking the Line is an album by Canadian jazz pianist and composer Oscar Peterson, released in 1970. Recorded at: MPS Tonstudio Villingen.

Critical reception

AllMusic critic Ken Dryden stated in his review: "Oscar Peterson's series of recordings for Hans Georg Brunner-Schwer during the 1960s and early '70s are one of many high points in his long career... His mastery of the ballad form is heard in his sensitive interpretation of "Once Upon a Summertime,"...

Track listing
 "I Love You" (Cole Porter) – 5:14
 "Rock of Ages" (Jack Fascinato, Tennessee Ernie Ford) – 5:32
 "Once Upon a Summertime" (Eddie Barclay, Michel Legrand, Eddy Marnay, Johnny Mercer) – 5:19
 "Just Friends" (John Klenner, Sam M. Lewis) – 3:58
 "Teach Me Tonight" (Sammy Cahn, Gene DePaul) – 5:07
 "The Windmills of Your Mind" (Alan Bergman, Marilyn Bergman, Michel Legrand) – 5:04
 "I Didn't Know What Time It Was" (Lorenz Hart, Richard Rodgers) – 6:37
 "All of You" (Porter) – 5:01

Personnel

Performance
 Oscar Peterson – piano
 George Mraz – double bass
 Ray Price – drums

References

1970 albums
Oscar Peterson albums
MPS Records albums